Teoman Koman ( – 14 December 2013) was a Turkish general who retired in 1997. He was General Commander of the Gendarmerie of Turkey (1995 - 1997) and previously head of the National Intelligence Organization (1988 - 1992) and Deputy Secretary-General of the National Security Council (1986 - 1988).

Koman was charged with being involved with the 1997 "post-modern coup". Koman told the Ergenekon trials that he was aware of the existence of the JITEM Gendarmerie unit during his tenure, and that it was an unofficial association of Gendarmerie members, which he had banned.

As a young officer he was rumored to have slapped Former Prime Minister Adnan Menderes in his cell during Yassıada trials

References 

1936 births
2013 deaths
Turkish Army generals
General Commanders of the Gendarmerie of Turkey
People of the National Intelligence Organization (Turkey)
Burials at Ulus Cemetery